Andriy Hrinchenko (born 23 January 1986) is a professional Ukrainian football defender who played for FC Volyn Lutsk in the Ukrainian Premier League.

External links

 Official Website Profile

1986 births
Living people
Ukrainian footballers
FC Zorya Luhansk players
FC Volyn Lutsk players
FC Hoverla Uzhhorod players
FC Nyva Ternopil players
Association football defenders
Sportspeople from Ternopil